The Trout River Bridge is a six lane segmental bridge carrying Interstate 95 across Trout River,  north of downtown Jacksonville, Florida. It is the third crossing of I-95 south of Georgia. A Trout River Bridge Replacement project commenced in 2005 which replaced the original bridge with a six lane bridge; this project was completed in July 2008.

References

Bridges in Jacksonville, Florida
Interstate 95
Road bridges in Florida
Bridges on the Interstate Highway System
Tolled sections of Interstate Highways
Former toll bridges in Florida
2008 establishments in Florida
Northside, Jacksonville

Bridges completed in 2008